Carphobius is a genus of crenulate bark beetles in the family Curculionidae. There are at least three described species in Carphobius.

Species
These three species belong to the genus Carphobius:
 Carphobius arizonicus Blackman, 1943
 Carphobius cupressi Wood, 1974a
 Carphobius pilifer Wood, 1983a

References

Further reading

 
 
 

Scolytinae
Articles created by Qbugbot